Left for Dead may refer to:

Books 
 Left For Dead, a 2000 book by mountain climber Beck Weathers
 Left for Dead, a 2007 book by sailor Nick Ward about the 1979 Fastnet race

Film and television 
 "Left for Dead", a 2004 episode of the American television drama series NCIS
 Left for Dead (2005 film), a British martial arts film
 Left for Dead (2007 horror film), a 2007 Canadian horror film
 Left for Dead (2007 Western film), a 2007 American-Argentine horror western film
 Ed Stafford: Left For Dead, a 2017 television series hosted by English explorer Ed Stafford
 Wrong Turn 3: Left for Dead, a 2009 horror film

Games 
 Left 4 Dead, a 2008 video game developed by Valve
 Left 4 Dead 2, the sequel released in 2009

Music 
 Left for Dead (Crazy Horse album), 1989
 Left for Dead (Lustra album), 2006
 Left for Dead (Wussy album), 2007
 Left for Dead (Lȧȧz Rockit album), 2008
 Left for Dead (EP), released in 2003 by Shootin' Goon
 "Left for Dead", a song by Tribe of Judah from the 2002 album Exit Elvis
 "Left for Dead", a song by Death Angel from the 2013 album The Dream Calls for Blood
 "Left Me For Dead", a song by Rob Dougan from the 2002 album Furious Angels